Fontenay-le-Vicomte is a commune in the Essonne department in Île-de-France in northern France.

Inhabitants of Fontenay-le-Vicomte are known as Fontenaysiens.

See also
Communes of the Essonne department

References

External links

Official website 

Mayors of Essonne Association 

Communes of Essonne